Thiago de Sousa Bezerra (born 8 December 1987 in Miracema do Tocantins), commonly known as Thiago Miracema, is a Brazilian footballer, who plays as a winger for Costa Rica.

Career
In the winter of 2011, Miracema signed for São José on a four-month's loan. He made his Campeonato Gaúcho debut on 16 January, in a 2–2 away draw against Internacional.

On 8 June 2011, Miracema transferred to Litex Lovech together with his Sampaio Corrêa teammate Célio Codó on a season-long loan. He played for PFC Montana during the second half of the 2012/2013 A PFG season, but returned to his country following the team's relegation to the second division.

In January 2014, Miracema signed an 18-month contract with Ravan Baku in the Azerbaijan Premier League. Following Ravan Baku's relegation to the Azerbaijan First Division, Miracema signed for Campeonato Brasileiro Série B side Icasa. In January 2016, he joined Brasiliense.

Club statistics

Honours

Club
Sampaio Corrêa
 Campeonato Maranhense (1): 2010

References

External links
 
 

1987 births
Living people
Brazilian footballers
Brazilian expatriate footballers
Vila Nova Futebol Clube players
São José Esporte Clube players
PFC Litex Lovech players
FC Montana players
Association football midfielders
Expatriate footballers in Bulgaria
First Professional Football League (Bulgaria) players
Ravan Baku FC players
Sportspeople from Tocantins